{{Infobox video game
| title=Baseball
| image=Baseball NES box art.jpg
| caption=North American NES box art
| developer=Nintendo R&D1
| publisher=Nintendo
| composer=Yukio KaneokaHirokazu Tanaka
| platforms=Famicom/NESArcadePlayChoice-10Famicom Disk SystemGame Boy
  
| released={{Unbulleted list | Famicom/NESVs. Baseball (arcade) | }}
| designer = Shigeru Miyamoto
| genre=Sports
| modes=Single-player, two-player
| series=Mario Baseball
| arcade system = Nintendo VS. System
}}
 is a video game from Nintendo. It was released December 7, 1983, after the July 15 launch of the Famicom in Japan. In 1984, it was ported to the VS. System arcade as VS. Baseball with additional graphics and speech, becoming a number one hit in Japan and North America that year. It was localized as a Nintendo Entertainment System launch game in North America in 1985, and in Europe in 1986. IGN said the universal appeal of the American sport made Baseball a key to the NES's successful test market introduction, and an important piece of Nintendo history. The game was also competing with Sega's arcade hit Champion Baseball, released earlier in 1983.

Gameplay
As in real baseball, the object of the game is to score the most runs. The game supports one player versus a computer opponent, or two players. Each player can select from one of six teams.

Though lacking a license of official team names, their initials in the game correspond to the Japanese Central League or the American Major League Baseball teams in their respective regions. The only gameplay difference between teams is the uniform colors.

Development and release
Shigeru Miyamoto recalled that in 1983, he "personally really wanted there to be a Baseball game" for the Famicom, and was "directly in charge of the character design and the game design". The Famicom had only three launch day games on July 15, 1983, and Baseball was released on December 7, 1983totaling seven games by 1984.

At the 1985 launch of the Nintendo Entertainment System in the Manhattan initial test market, the game was featured prominently among 17 total games. It was demonstrated on a large projector screen, by real Major League Baseball athletes who played the video game and signed autographs for fans. Because the video game industry was so young and had crashed in America in 1983, and because some other NES launch games like Clu Clu Land have abstract fantasy themes that are not instantly recognizable by a new audience, the presence of a traditional American pastime was said to be an instantly relatable aid to the system's introduction.

It was ported to the arcade VS. System as VS. Baseball in 1984, competing with Sega's popular Champion Baseball (1983).

Ports

Reception
In Japan,  copies of the original Famicom version of Baseball were sold. Worldwide,  copies were sold for Famicom and NES.

Game Machine magazine named VS. Baseball as Japan's most successful table arcade cabinet of June and July 1984. In the United States, VS. Baseball topped the arcade software conversion kit charts for several months in 1984: the RePlay charts from September through October to November, and the Play Meter charts from October to November. Play Meter also listed it as the top-grossing arcade game in December 1984. In Europe, it had become a very popular arcade game by 1986.

In 2007, IGN gave Baseball a 5.5 out of 10, noting its depth of pitching, its two-player support, "its still-intact sense of fun", and its important place in Nintendo's history. The review said that the 1985 test market launch of the Nintendo Entertainment System had "heavily relied upon" Baseball, due to the globally recognizable status of the sport. The review summarized that "the NES came out a winner—thanks, in part, to Baseball".

In 2006, GameSpot gave Baseball a 4.2 out of 10, stating that while it was easy to play, the "bare-bones" replica of the sport "hasn't withstood the test of time".

In 2020, historian Ken Horowitz said VS. Baseball (1984) lacks certain features of the competing Sega's Champion Baseball (1983), but has superior multiplayer capabilities.

Baseball was a significant source of inspiration for Namco's Pro Baseball: Family Stadium (1986) for Famicom, which became the R.B.I. Baseball series.

Notes

References

External links
Baseball at NinDB

1983 video games
Nintendo Research & Development 1 games
Nintendo Entertainment System games
Famicom Disk System games
Game Boy games
Nintendo e-Reader games
Major League Baseball video games
Baseball video games
PlayChoice-10 games
Virtual Console games for Wii
Virtual Console games for Wii U
Multiplayer and single-player video games
Video games scored by Hirokazu Tanaka
Video games designed by Shigeru Miyamoto
Video games developed in Japan
Nintendo games
Nintendo arcade games
Nintendo Vs. Series games
Nintendo Switch Online games
Virtual Console games for Nintendo 3DS